United Nations Security Council Resolution 74, adopted on September 16, 1949, having received and examined a letter from the Chairman of the Atomic Energy Commission transmitting two resolutions, the Council directed the Secretary-General to transmit this letter and the accompanying resolutions, along with records of the discussion of this question in the AEC to the General Assembly and to the Member States of the UN.

The resolution passed by nine votes in favour, with abstentions from the Ukrainian SSR and Soviet Union.

See also
List of United Nations Security Council Resolutions 1 to 100 (1946–1953)

References
Text of the Resolution at undocs.org

External links
 

 0074
September 1949 events